Elizabeth Jane "Betchen" Wayland Barber (also E. J. W. Barber) is an American scholar and expert on archaeology, linguistics, textiles, and folk dance as well as Professor emerita of archaeology and linguistics at Occidental College.

Early life
Wayland Barber was born in 1940, in Pasadena. She became interested in archaeology at a young age because of her love of interdisciplinary sciences. Her family moved to France during her childhood, where she learned French, beginning her interest in linguistics. She first developed expert sewing and weaving skills under her mother's tutelage.

Scholarly work
She earned a bachelor's degree from Bryn Mawr College in Archaeology and Greek in 1962.  Her chief mentor was Mabel Lang from whom she learned Linear B and who advised her honors thesis on Linear A. In addition to Lang, she wrote her thesis under Emmett L. Bennett Jr. Her thesis used computer indices of the Hagia Triada Linear A texts in an attempt to decipher its signs and symbols. The computer indices were made via punched cards, a method which was preceded by the work of Alice E. Kober on Linear B. She earned her PhD from Yale University in linguistics in 1968. Her doctoral study at Yale University was supervised by Sydney Lamb, under whom she wrote her dissertation, "The Computer Aided Analysis of Undeciphered Ancient Texts."

Books
Her books include Prehistoric Textiles: The Development of Cloth in the Neolithic and Bronze Ages with Special Reference to the Aegean (1992), Women's Work: The First 20,000 Years; Women, Cloth, and Society in Early Times (1995), The Mummies of Ürümchi (1999), When They Severed Earth from Sky: How the Human Mind Shapes Myth (2004, coauthor with Paul T. Barber), The Dancing Goddesses: Folklore, Archaeology, and the Origins of European Dance (2013), Resplendent Dress from Southeastern Europe: A History in Layers (2013), and Two Thoughts with but a Single Mind: Crime and Punishment and the Writing of Fiction (2013, co-author with P. T. Barber and Mary F. Zirin).

Among other things, she has proposed that if 19th-century scientists had thought to name prehistorical periods with an eye on women's work and the things they invented, instead of focusing their naming only on men's more durable inventions (Iron Age, Bronze Age, etc.), that they might have acknowledged women's invention of string as what she has named “The String Revolution.”

Personal life
In addition to her academic work, as of 2009 she has directed and choreographed for her own folk and historical dance troupe for 38 years.

In 2016 and 2017 Dr. Barber's dance troupe performed at UCLA (See Video), Occidental College, and 2017 Sunshine Statewide Folk Dance Festival.

References

External links
Elizabeth Wayland Barber speaks on the Xinjiang Textiles: More Corridors in the Goldmine at the Silk Road Symposium held at the Penn Museum in March 2011.

Living people
American women archaeologists
Linguists from the United States
Bryn Mawr College alumni
Indo-Europeanists
Yale Graduate School of Arts and Sciences alumni
20th-century American archaeologists
21st-century American archaeologists
20th-century American writers
21st-century American writers
20th-century American women writers
21st-century American women writers
Year of birth missing (living people)
Women linguists
Textile historians